Ephemerella aurivillii is a species of spiny crawler mayfly in the family Ephemerellidae. It is found in Europe and Northern Asia (excluding China), North America. In North America its range includes all of Canada, the northern, southwestern United States, and Alaska.

References

Mayflies
Articles created by Qbugbot
Insects described in 1908